Graeme K Talboys is an English writer and teacher.

Life

Graeme Keith Talboys was born at Queen Charlotte's and Chelsea Hospital in Hammersmith on Thursday 26 November 1953.

Writing

He is represented by Leslie Gardner of Artellus.

Reception

Talboys was nominated for The Guardian's "Not the Booker Prize 2011."

In 2014, he was among 15 "mostly unagented writers" signed by HarperVoyager, the novels including his Exile and Pilgrim to be released digitally, followed by short-run paperback editions.

Bibliography

Non-fiction
Using Museums as an Educational Resource
Museum Educator's Handbook
Museum Educator's Handbook (Chinese language edition)
the Voice within the Wind – of Becoming and the Druid Way (writing as Greywind)
Aaargh!! to Zizz – 135 Drama Games
the Path through the Forest – a Druid Guidebook (with Julie White)
Arianrhod's Dance – a Druid Ritual Handbook (with Julie White)
Way of the Druid
The Druid Way Made Easy
Paganism 101 by 101 Pagans (contributory essay)
Naming the Goddess (contributory essay)

Fiction
Wealden Hill
Thin Reflections (book one of the 'Storm Light' sequence)
The Mirror That Is Made (book two of the 'Storm Light' sequence)
Stormwrack (short stories from the 'Storm Light' sequence, illustrated by Carol Burns)
Shadow in the Storm - The Chronicles of Jeniche of Antar
1 - Stealing into Winter
2 - Exile and Pilgrim
3 - Players of the Game
4 - Thunder on the Mountain

The Night Road as by John Charles Woodman
The Archives (inspired by the album of the same name by Omenopus)

as editor
First Class: Early Works of the Nearly Famous – Orchid Station

Projects involved with
Into the Media Web by Michael Moorcock
Sojan the Swordsman by Michael Moorcock (in Sojan the Swordsman/Under the Warrior Star by Michael Moorcock and Joe R. Lansdale)

References

External links
 website

People from Hammersmith
Schoolteachers from London
Drama teachers
English non-fiction writers
Living people
People educated at the City of Norwich School
1953 births
English male non-fiction writers
People educated at Priory School, Lewes